Yrkesinstitutet Prakticum is a secondary vocational institution in the Greater Helsinki area, it offers initial vocational education for young people and adults. The language of instruction is mainly in Swedish.

Study programmes:
Automation Assembler
Beauty Therapist
Business and Administration Clerk
Business Information Technician
Cook
Electrician
Hairdresser
Hotel Receptionist 
ICT Assembler
Media Assistant
Practical Nurse
Technology Vendor
Waiter/Waitress 
Vehicle Mechanic

References 

Buildings and structures in Porvoo
Secondary schools in Finland